Kjeldebotn Church is a parish church of the Church of Norway in Narvik Municipality in Nordland county, Norway. It is located in the village of Kjeldebotn. It is one of the churches for the Ballangen parish which is part of the Ofoten prosti (deanery) in the Diocese of Sør-Hålogaland. The white, wooden church was built in a long church style in 1956 using plans drawn up by the architects Liv and Alf Bugge. The church seats about 200 people. The church holds at least one worship service each month.

See also
List of churches in Sør-Hålogaland

References

Narvik
Churches in Nordland
Wooden churches in Norway
20th-century Church of Norway church buildings
Churches completed in 1956
1956 establishments in Norway
Long churches in Norway